John Shaw (born 1982 in Raharney, County Westmeath, Ireland) is an Irish sportsperson.  He plays hurling with his local club Raharney and has been a member of the Westmeath senior inter-county team since 2000.

References

Teams

1982 births
Living people
Raharney hurlers
Westmeath inter-county hurlers